Hendricks Holding, Inc. (HHC) is a privately held conglomerate based in Beloit, Wisconsin, United States.

History and management 
The company was founded in 1982 by Ken Hendricks and Diane Hendricks, owners of ABC Supply.

By the time of his death on December 21, 2007, Ken Hendricks was the 107th richest person in America according to Forbes October 2006 issue. He was replaced by Keith Rozolis.

Operations and holdings 

The Hendrick Holding now includes numerous enterprises that span the fields of industry, transportation and logistics, insurance, real estate and construction, recycling, restaurants, and the film industry.

References 

Beloit, Wisconsin
Companies based in Wisconsin
Conglomerate companies established in 1982
Conglomerate companies of the United States
Privately held companies based in Wisconsin
1982 establishments in Wisconsin